From 30 March to 3 April 1944 the United States Fifth Air Force, under the command of General George Kenney, conducted a series of bombing raids on the important airbase of Hollandia that led to the destruction of 340 Japanese airplanes on the ground and 60 Japanese airplanes shot down in combat. This raid was an important factor in the success of the upcoming Battle of Hollandia later in April.

On 30–31 March the Fifth Air Force destroyed or heavily damaged a total of 208 Japanese aircraft. After a two day break for rest and weather delays on 3 April the U.S. bombers and fighters made the biggest bombing raid of the whole operation when 66 B-24 bombers and 96 A-20 bombers with escorting fighters destroyed or heavily damaged around 200 more Japanese aircraft. After the invasion of Hollandia occurred weeks later the Allied forces on the ground confirmed 340 Japanese planes were destroyed on the airfield. Gunner crews and fighter pilots confirmed another 60 planes destroyed in dogfights. This was the last major Japanese airbase in New Guinea with a substantial number of aircraft that could threaten the U.S. and Australian forces. After the Hollandia bombing raid the Japanese no longer had any substantial air power in all of New Guinea for the rest of the war. Air supremacy was established by the Allied forces. One squadron reported after returning from the raid that "Hollandia had really been Wewaked.'"

Japanese prisoners-of-war and captured documents later revealed that the reason the bombing operation was so successful was because the Japanese high command erroneously transported too many airplanes to Hollandia from the Philippines and the Dutch East Indies but did not transport more pilots and maintenance crews with the airplanes. There was no way for them to build appropriate defensive shelters to protect all 400 aircraft and also there were not enough trained pilots who could fly all of those airplanes at the same time so many perfectly operational aircraft were left sitting there with no aircrew to maintain them. The morale at Hollandia airbase was very low during the bombing operation, with many Japanese soldiers and airmen hiding in bunkers instead of manning anti-aircraft artillery and getting airplanes into the air. Most of these Hollandia soldiers and airmen were rear-echelon and not combat-oriented at all because most of the combat-trained divisions from the 18th Army were recently sent further east in anticipation of amphibious landings that would never come thanks to deception and feints by the U.S. and Australians. A Japanese seaman commented, "Yesterday, the anniversary of the birthday of Emperor Meiji, we received from the enemy, greetings, which amount to the annihilation of our Army Air Force in New Guinea."

References

Bibliography 
 
 
 
 

1944 in Papua New Guinea
Hollandia
Hollandia
1944 in the Dutch East Indies
South West Pacific theatre of World War II
Hollandia